Uladzimir Ignatik was the defending champion, however chose to not compete this year.
3rd seed Tatsuma Ito won in the final match 6–4, 6–2, against his compatriot, 4th seed Yuichi Sugita.

Seeds

Draw

Finals

Top half

Bottom half

References
Main Draw
Qualifying Singles

Singles
2010 Men's Singles